Major Roger Francis Mortimer (22 November 1909 – November 1991), was an English horse-racing correspondent, Coldstream Guards officer, prisoner of war, and author.

Son of Haliburton Stanley Mortimer (1879-1957), of 11 Cadogan Gardens, Chelsea (a London stockbroker), and Dorothy Blackwell, of Crosse & Blackwell, he was educated at Ludgrove, Eton and Sandhurst, and joined the Coldstream Guards in 1930. He was a Captain at Dunkirk (BEF, 1940) but was captured unconscious, all his men having been killed. Sir Frederick Vernon Corfield, QC, PC, and Freddy Burnaby-Atkins were among his friends made as a prisoner of war (no. 481, in the various Oflags and Stalags). He left the army in 1947 having post-war served in Trieste, and took an appointment at Raceform.

For 29 years, from 1947-1975, he was the Sunday Times' racing correspondent (aka Fairway). He was succeeded by Brough Scott. He was also The Tote's PR and a racing reporter for BBC radio 2.

In 1947 Mortimer married Cynthia Sydney Denison-Pender, a niece of the 1st Lord Pender and granddaughter of Sir John Denison Denison-Pender, GBE, KCMG. Cynthia's sister Pamela had married General Sir Kenneth Thomas Darling, GBE, KCB, DSO, in 1941.

He was father of three: Jane Clare, Charles Roger Henry and Louise Star. His letters to them were published in 2012, 2013 and 2014. He lived at Budds Farm at Burghclere in Hampshire.

Books
Dearest Jane ...: My Father's Life and Letters, by Roger Mortimer and Jane Torday, Constable, 2014 (lacks an index and list of dramatis personae unlike her siblings' earlier volumes);
Dear Lumpy by Roger Mortimer and Louise Mortimer, Constable & Robinson, 2013;
Dear Lupin: Letters To A Wayward Son, by Roger Mortimer and Charlie Mortimer, Constable & Robinson, 2012. Hardback reached No 2 on The Sunday Times Bestseller list and sold in excess of 40,000 copies. Dear Lupin was BBC Radio 4's 'Book of the Week'. Sold over 120,000 copies in all formats.);
 The History of the Derby Stakes,Cassell (publisher) 1962 updated edition Michael Joseph, London, 1972;
 The Jockey Club, Cassell, London, 1958;
 Anthony Mildmay, MacGibbon & Kee, 1956;
 Twenty Great Horses, Cassell / Littlehampton Book Services Ltd, 1967;
 Twenty Great Horses of the British Turf, A. S. Barnes and Company, South Brunswick, NJ., 1968;
 The Flat: Flat racing in Britain since 1939, Allen and Unwin, 1979;
 Biographical Encyclopaedia of British Flat Racing, (Roger Mortimer, Richard Onslow, Peter Willet), MacDonald & Janes Ltd./ TBS The Book Service Ltd, London, 1978;
 Encyclopaedia of Flat Racing, Howard Wright & Roger Mortimer, Robert Hale, 1971 & 1986;
 Derby 200. The Official Story of the Blue Riband of the Turf, Michael Seth-Smith & Roger Mortimer, Guinness Superlatives, London, 1979.
 The Epsom Derby  , Roger Mortimer with Tim Neligan ,  Michael Joseph , 1984.

External
The Spectator's review of Jane Torday's book
Review in The Guardian
Telegraph review
John Karter: 'Mortimer: never at a loss for words', Mortimer's obituary in The Sunday Times, 1 December 1991

References

1909 births
1991 deaths
People educated at Ludgrove School
People educated at Eton College
Graduates of the Royal Military College, Sandhurst
Coldstream Guards officers
British horse racing writers and broadcasters
BBC sports presenters and reporters
The Sunday Times people
People from Burghclere
British World War II prisoners of war
World War II prisoners of war held by Germany
People from Chelsea, London